Swedish Highly Advanced Research Configuration (SHARC) is an experimental stealth unmanned aerial vehicle (UAV) built by Saab AB. Saab also plays a role in the creation of UAVs such as the stealth UAV Filur and stealth UCAV Dassault nEUROn.

References

External links
SHARC Technology demonstrator (Saab AB)

Saab aircraft
Unmanned military aircraft of Sweden
Stealth aircraft